The Women's 5000 metres at the 2014 Commonwealth Games, as part of the athletics programme, was held at Hampden Park on 2 August 2014.

Results

References

Women's 5000 metres
2014
2014 in women's athletics